Ha Ha Hayop is a Philippine comedy's show and broadcast which has run from November 24, 2008 to August 31, 2009. It is aired on TV5. This show is presented by Eugene Domingo.

See also
List of programs aired by The 5 Network

References

2008 Philippine television series debuts
2009 Philippine television series endings
TV5 (Philippine TV network) original programming
Philippine comedy television series
Filipino-language television shows